Morse High School is the name of several high schools:

 Morse High School (California) San Diego, California
 Morse High School (Maine) Bath, Maine